BrightDrop is a subsidiary business created by the American manufacturer General Motors in 2021. The business offers a system of connected products targeting first- and last-mile delivery customers, including light commercial electric vehicles, and cloud-based software.

Its first products, the BrightDrop Zevo delivery van and Trace electric cart, were unveiled at the Consumer Electronics Show in Las Vegas, Nevada on 12 January 2021.  General Motors announced in 2021 it would invest $800 million to produce the Zevo 600 in the CAMI Automotive manufacturing facility in Ingersoll, Canada. In 2022, CEO Travis Katz announced the company was on track to generate $1 billion in revenue in 2023, making BrightDrop one of the fastest companies in history to achieve this milestone.

History
BrightDrop, is one of the first successful businesses started in GM's Global Innovation incubator, headed at the time by engineer Pam Fletcher.  Study of potential concepts for urban delivery began in September 2019 under the code name Smart Cargo. By February 2020, the Smart Cargo concept had evolved to include a potential electric delivery van and an electrically propelled container for delivery businesses. Later that year, GM announced the appointment of technology entrepreneur and investor Travis Katz to become president and CEO of BrightDrop. Previously, Katz had held executive roles at Redpoint Ventures, Skyscanner, and MySpace; he was also CEO and co-founder of Trip.com.

GM CEO Mary Barra introduced the BrightDrop brand as part of her address at the Consumer Electronics Show in January 2021. After the announcement, GM's stock reached its highest price since its initial public offering in 2010.

BrightDrop changed the names of its entire lineup of products in April 2022. The EV600 was renamed to Zevo inclusive of two variants, the Zevo 600 and Zevo 400 (previously known as EV600 and EV410 respectively) and the BrightDrop Trace (previously known as EP1.)

Products

BrightDrop's first two products are the Zevo 600 electric van and Trace electric pallet. The Zevo 600 is powered by GM's Ultium battery platform and is purpose-built for the delivery of goods and services over long distances. It has a built-in security system and a range of 250 miles per charge. Its name is a play on its 600 cubic feet of cargo space.

The BrightDrop Trace can carry up to 23 cubic feet and 200 pounds. It has a built-in electric motor to move at a speed of up to 3 miles per hour, adjusting to the walking speed of its operator. It helps delivery workers move goods over short distances, like from a van to a customer's front door. It has adjustable shelves and doors that can be remotely locked and unlocked. In a pilot program with FedEx, couriers were able to handle 25% more packages per day with the Trace and experienced less physical strain.

The company also has a cloud-based software platform accessible by web or mobile app. Its software can monitor vehicle locations and battery charges, manage vehicles remotely, predict maintenance needs, and optimize routes.

A smaller version of BrightDrop's van, to be called the Zevo 400, will be built at the CAMI Assembly Plant in Ingersoll, Canada from 2023, with the first models going to the fleet of Verizon.

Operations
BrightDrop is developing electric vans, related hardware, support services and software for use by commercial delivery firms. It is part of a larger initiative at GM to have an all-electric lineup of vehicles by 2035. BrightDrop's first customer is FedEx, which placed an initial order for 500 Zevo 600 vehicles. Merchants Fleet, a fleet management company, is slated to purchase an additional 12,600 Zevo 600s starting in 2023.

GM's CAMI Assembly Plant in Ingersoll, Ontario, will manufacture the Zevo 600, making it Canada's first large-scale auto plant converted to produce electric delivery vehicles. GM stated that it invested $2 billion converting the plant to a state of the art EV manufacturing facility. Canadian Prime Minister Justin Trudeau and Ontario Premier Doug Ford attended the opening of the plant in December, 2022.

References

External links

 

Battery electric vehicle manufacturers
Electric vehicle manufacturers of the United States
General Motors marques
General Motors subsidiaries